Xhaka is an Albanian surname. Notable people with the surname include:

 Granit Xhaka (born 1992), Swiss footballer
 Taulant Xhaka (born 1991), Swiss-Albanian footballer, brother of Granit

Albanian-language surnames